Hapda is a monotypic moth genus of the family Erebidae described by Nye in 1975. It was first described by Francis Walker in 1863 as Dapha. Its only species, Hapda exhibens, was described by Walker in 1863.

References

Hypeninae
Monotypic moth genera